Jacob Mol (3 February 1912 – 9 December 1972) was a Dutch football forward who was selected for the Netherlands in the 1934 FIFA World Cup. He also played for KFC, DWS, RKAV Amstelveen and ZFC.

References

External links
 FIFA profile

1912 births
1972 deaths
Dutch footballers
Netherlands international footballers
Association football forwards
1934 FIFA World Cup players
Footballers from Zaanstad